RXR may stand for 

 RXR Realty, a real estate owner, manager, and developer located in New York City
 The Retinoid X receptor found in cells. 
 Railroad crossing, railway crossing, or level crossing
 Revco, American company, NYSE code RXR
 Rosberg X Racing (Rosberg eXtreme Racing), an Extreme E electric offroad rally racing team founded by Nico Rosberg

See also

 RR (disambiguation)
 R2 (disambiguation)
 2R (disambiguation)
 R (disambiguation)